Suzanna Leigh (born Sandra Eileen Anne Smith; 26 July 1945 – 11 December 2017) was a British actress, known for her film and television roles in the 1960s and 1970s.

Early life and education
Born Sandra Eileen Anne Smith on 26 July 1945, Leigh grew up in Berkshire, England, and later went to convent schools outside London. She began working in films while still a child, appearing as an extra in several British productions. She changed her name to Suzanna Leigh after entering film, whilst under the tutelage of her godmother, Vivien Leigh.

Career
Leigh's film roles include the love interest of Elvis Presley in Paradise, Hawaiian Style (1966), a stewardess in the comedy Boeing Boeing (1965), and as the frail heroine in a couple of Hammer films - The Lost Continent (1968) and Lust for a Vampire (1971).

She starred in the cult British horror films The Deadly Bees (1966) and The Fiend (1972). In 1974 she starred as Amber in Son of Dracula. In 2015, she was a featured player in the film, Grace of the Father. She wrote a 2000 autobiography, Paradise, Suzanna Style, and was the mother of actress Natalia Leigh Denny.

Death
Leigh was diagnosed with stage-four liver cancer in September 2016 and died in December 2017 in Winter Garden, Florida.

Filmography

Writings
 Paradise, Suzanna Style
 2014: "Thank you, Lord", Touched by an Angel, chickensoup.com; accessed 14 December 2017.

References

External links
 Interview with Joe Krein, Elvis2001.net
 InStyle UK: 60s Fashion: Women Who Made The Decade Achingly Cool (pictured at numbers 32 & 42), instyle.co.uk

1945 births
2017 deaths
20th-century English actresses
Actresses from Berkshire
Actors from Reading, Berkshire
English film actresses
English television actresses
Deaths from liver cancer
Deaths from cancer in Florida